Kościuszko pod Racławicami is a Polish historical film. It was released in 1938.

Cast 
 Tadeusz Białoszczyński – Tadeusz Kościuszko
 Franciszek Dominiak – Wojciech Głowacki
 Bogusław Samborski – brigadier Antoni Madaliński
 Józef Węgrzyn – general Józef Wodzicki
 Tadeusz Frenkiel – hetman Ożarowski
 Gustaw Buszyński – Osip Igelstrom
 Elżbieta Barszczewska – Hanka
 Witold Zacharewicz – lieutenant Jan Milewski
 Jerzy Pichelski – rotmistrz Kazimierz Brochacki
 Jan Kurnakowicz – sergeant Biedroń

References

External links
 

1938 films
Polish historical films
1930s Polish-language films
Polish black-and-white films
1930s historical films